Pablo Clavería Herráiz (born 1 April 1996) is a Spanish footballer who plays as a central midfielder for CD Lugo.

Club career
Born in Madrid, Clavería joined Rayo Vallecano's youth setup in 2010 at the age of 14, after starting out at neighbouring Getafe CF. On 12 December 2014, even before having appeared with the reserves, he was called up by Paco Jémez to a La Liga match against Valencia CF; one day later, he came on as a late substitute for Raúl Baena in the 0–3 loss at the Mestalla Stadium.

Clavería subsequently resumed his spell with the B-side, appearing in both Segunda División B and Tercera División. On 14 August 2017, he signed for another reserve team, Atlético Malagueño also in the fourth division.

On 13 August 2018, Clavería signed a one-year deal with CF Fuenlabrada in the third division. The following 23 June, after helping in the team's first-ever promotion to the second division, he renewed his contract for a further year.

On 26 August 2020, Clavería signed a two-year deal with second division newcomers FC Cartagena. On 28 January 2022, he terminated his contract with the club, and moved to fellow league team CD Lugo on a two-and-a-half-year contract three days later.

References

External links
 
 

1996 births
Living people
Footballers from Madrid
Spanish footballers
Association football midfielders
La Liga players
Segunda División players
Segunda División B players
Tercera División players
Rayo Vallecano B players
Rayo Vallecano players
Atlético Malagueño players
CF Fuenlabrada footballers
FC Cartagena footballers
CD Lugo players